"Bartleby, the Scrivener: A Story of Wall Street" is a short story by the American writer Herman Melville, first serialized anonymously in two parts in the November and December 1853 issues of Putnam's Magazine and reprinted with minor textual alterations in his The Piazza Tales in 1856. In the story, a Wall Street lawyer hires a new clerk who, after an initial bout of hard work, refuses to make copies or do any other task required of him, refusing with the words "I would prefer not to."

Numerous critical essays have been published about the story, which scholar Robert Milder describes as "unquestionably the masterpiece of the short fiction" in the Melville canon.

Plot 
The narrator is an unnamed elderly lawyer who works with legal documents and has an office on Wall Street. He already employs two scriveners, Turkey and Nippers, to copy documents by hand, but an increase in business leads him to advertise for a third. He hires the forlorn-looking Bartleby in the hope that his calmness will soothe the other two, each of whom displays an irascible temperament during an opposite half of the day. An office boy nicknamed Ginger Nut completes the staff.

At first, Bartleby produces a large volume of high-quality work, but one day, when asked to help proofread a document, Bartleby answers with what soon becomes his perpetual response to every request: "I would prefer not to." To the dismay of the narrator and the irritation of the other employees, Bartleby begins to perform fewer and fewer tasks and eventually none. He instead spends long periods of time staring out one of the office's windows at a brick wall. The narrator makes several attempts to reason with Bartleby or to learn something about him, but never has any success. When the narrator stops by the office one Sunday morning, he discovers that Bartleby is living there. He is saddened by the thought of the life the young man must lead.

Tension builds as business associates wonder why Bartleby is always present in the office, yet does not appear to do any work. Sensing the threat to his reputation, but emotionally unable to evict Bartleby, the narrator moves his business to a different building. The new tenant of his old office comes to ask for help in removing Bartleby, and the narrator tells the man that he is not responsible for his former employee. A week or so after this, several other tenants of the narrator's former office building come to him with their landlord because Bartleby is still making a nuisance of himself; even though he has been put out of the office, he sits on the building stairs all day and sleeps in its doorway at night. The narrator agrees to visit Bartleby and attempts to reason with him. He suggests several jobs that Bartleby might try and even invites Bartleby to live with him until they figure out a better solution. Bartleby replies that he would "prefer not to make any change", and declines the offer. The narrator leaves the building and flees the neighborhood for several days, in order not to be bothered by the landlord and tenants.

When the narrator returns to work, he learns that the landlord has called the police. The officers have arrested Bartleby and imprisoned him in the Tombs as a vagrant. He goes to visit Bartleby, who spurns him, and bribes a cook to make sure Bartleby gets enough food. The narrator returns a few days later to check on Bartleby and discovers him dead of starvation, having preferred not to eat.

Months later, the narrator hears a rumor that Bartleby had once worked in a dead letter office and reflects on how this might have affected him. The story ends with the narrator saying, "Ah Bartleby! Ah humanity!"

Composition  
Melville's major source of inspiration for the story was an advertisement for a new book, The Lawyer's Story, printed in the Tribune and the Times on February 18, 1853. The book, published anonymously later that year, was written by popular novelist James A. Maitland. This advertisement included the complete first chapter, which started: "In the summer of 1843, having an extraordinary quantity of deeds to copy, I engaged, temporarily, an extra copying clerk, who interested me considerably, in consequence of his modest, quiet, gentlemanly demeanor, and his intense application to his duties." Melville biographer Hershel Parker said nothing else in the chapter besides this "remarkably evocative sentence" was notable. Critic Andrew Knighton said Melville may have been influenced by an obscure work from 1846, Robert Grant White's Law and Laziness: or, Students at Law of Leisure, which features an idle scrivener.

Melville may have written the story as an emotional response to the bad reviews garnered by Pierre, his preceding novel. Christopher Sten suggests that Melville found inspiration in Ralph Waldo Emerson's essays, particularly "The Transcendentalist", which shows parallels to "Bartleby".

Autobiographical interpretations 

Bartleby is a writer who withers and dies after refusing to copy other writers.
More specifically, he has been described as a copyist “who obstinately refuses to go on doing the sort of writing demanded of him." During the spring of 1851, Melville felt similarly about his work on Moby-Dick. Thus, Bartleby may represent Melville's frustration with his own situation as a writer, and the story is "about a writer who forsakes conventional modes because of an irresistible preoccupation with the most baffling philosophical questions." Bartleby may also represent Melville's relation to his commercial, democratic society.

Melville made an allusion to the John C. Colt case in "Bartleby". The narrator restrains his anger toward Bartleby by reflecting upon "the tragedy of the unfortunate Adams and the still more unfortunate Colt and how poor Colt, being dreadfully incensed by Adams ... was unawares hurled into his fatal act."

Analysis 
The narrator and the text do not explicitly explain the reason for Bartleby's behavior, leaving it open to interpretation.

As an example of clinical depression

Bartleby shows classic symptoms of depression, especially his lack of motivation. He is a passive person, and good at the work he agrees to do. He refuses to divulge any personal information to the narrator. Bartleby's death is consistent with depression—having no motivation to survive, he refrains from eating until he dies.

As a reflection of the narrator

Bartleby has been interpreted as a "psychological double" for the narrator that criticizes the "sterility, impersonality, and mechanical adjustments of the world which the lawyer inhabits." Until the end of the story, Bartleby's background is unknown and may have sprung from the narrator's mind. The narrator screens off Bartleby in a corner, which has been interpreted as symbolizing "the lawyer's compartmentalization of the unconscious forces which Bartleby represents."

Psychoanalyst Christopher Bollas says the main focus of the story is the narrator, whose "willingness to tolerate [Bartleby's] work stoppage is what needs to be explained ... As the story proceeds, it becomes increasingly clear that the lawyer identifies with his clerk. To be sure, it is an ambivalent identification, but that only makes it all the more powerful."

The narrator
Bartleby's employer provides a first-person narrative of his experiences working with Bartleby. He portrays himself as a kind and generous man. When Bartleby's work ethic declines, the narrator allows his employment to continue. He portrays himself as tolerant towards the other employees, Turkey and Nippers, who are confrontational in the afternoon and morning, respectively. The narrator is torn between his feelings of responsibility for Bartleby and his desire to be rid of the threat that Bartleby poses to the office and to his reputation on Wall Street.

Philosophical influences
"Bartleby, the Scrivener" alludes to Jonathan Edwards's "Inquiry into the Freedom of the Will" and Jay Leyda, in his introduction to The Complete Stories of Herman Melville, comments on the similarities between Bartleby and The Doctrine of Philosophical Necessity by Joseph Priestley. Both Edwards and Priestley wrote about free will and determinism. Edwards states that free will requires the will to be isolated from the moment of decision, in which case Bartleby's isolation from the world would allow him to be completely free. He has the ability to do whatever he pleases. The reference to Priestley and Edwards in connection with determinism may suggest that Bartleby's exceptional exercise of his personal will, even though it leads to his death, spares him from an externally determined fate.

"Bartleby" is also seen as an inquiry into ethics. Critic John Matteson sees the story (and other Melville works) as explorations of the changing meaning of 19th-century "prudence." The story's narrator "struggles to decide whether his ethics will be governed by worldly prudence or Christian agape." He wants to be humane, as shown by his accommodations of the four staff and especially of Bartleby, but this conflicts with the newer, pragmatic and economically based notion of prudence supported by changing legal theory. The 1850 case Brown v. Kendall, three years before the story's publication, was important in establishing the "reasonable man" standard in the United States, and emphasized the positive action required to avoid negligence. Bartleby's passivity has no place in a legal and economic system that increasingly sides with the "reasonable" and economically active individual. His fate, an innocent decline into unemployment, prison, and starvation, dramatizes the effect of the new prudence on the economically inactive members of society.

Publication history 
The story was first published anonymously as "Bartleby, the Scrivener: A Story of Wall-Street" in two installments in Putnam's Monthly Magazine, in November and December 1853. It was included in Melville's The Piazza Tales, published in by Dix & Edwards in the United States in May 1856 and in Britain in June.

Reception 
Though no great success at the time of publication, "Bartleby, the Scrivener" is now among the most noted of American short stories. It has been considered a precursor of absurdist literature, touching on several of Franz Kafka's themes in such works as "A Hunger Artist" and The Trial. There is nothing to indicate that the Bohemian writer was at all acquainted with the work of Melville, who remained largely forgotten until some time after Kafka's death.

Albert Camus, in a personal letter to Liselotte Dieckmann published in The French Review in 1998, cites Melville as a key influence.

Legacy

On November 5, 2019, the BBC News listed "Bartleby, the Scrivener" on its list of the 100 most influential novels.

Adaptations and references

Adaptations
 The story was adapted for the radio anthology series Favorite Story in 1948 under the name "The Strange Mister Bartleby." William Conrad plays the Narrator and Hans Conried plays Bartleby.
 In a BBC radio adaptation from 1953, Laurence Olivier plays the narrator. This was produced as an episode of "Theatre Royal", a series of radio dramas, which was the only radio series in which Lord Olivier took a major role.
 The York Playhouse produced a one-act opera, Bartleby, composed by William Flanagan and James J. Hinton, Jr. with a libretto by Edward Albee, from January 1 to February 28, 1961.
 The first filmed adaptation was by the Encyclopædia Britannica Educational Corporation in 1969. It was adapted, produced & directed by Larry Yust and starred James Westerfield and Patrick Campbell, with Barry Williams of The Brady Bunch fame in a small role. The story has been adapted for film four other times as  Bartleby: in 1970, starring Paul Scofield; in France, in 1976, by Maurice Ronet, starring Michel Lonsdale; in 1977, by Israel Horovitz and Michael B Styer for Maryland Center for Public Broadcasting, starring Nicholas Kepros, which was an entry in the 1978 Peabody Awards competition for television; and in 2001, by Jonathan Parker, starring Crispin Glover and David Paymer.
 The story was adapted and reinterpreted by Peter Straub in his 1997 story "Mr. Clubb and Mr. Cuff." It was also used as thematic inspiration for the Stephen King novel Bag of Bones.
 The BBC Radio 4 adaptation dramatised by Martyn Wade, directed by Cherry Cookson, and broadcast in 2004 stars Adrian Scarborough as Bartleby, Ian Holm as the Lawyer, David Collings as Turkey, and Jonathan Keeble as Nippers.
 The story was adapted for the stage in March 2007 by Alexander Gelman and the Organic Theater Company of Chicago.
 In 2009, French author Daniel Pennac read the story on the stage of La Pépinière-Théâtre in Paris.
 Bartleby, The Scrivener, an opera in two acts, with music by Daniel Steven Crafts and libretto by Erik Bauersfeld.
 In 2020, José Luis Munuera adapted the story as a graphic novel.
 The story was adapted for the stage in 2020 by Juhan Ulfsak for Von Krahl Theatre in Estonia as "Pigem ei" ("Rather not").

References to the story

Literature 
 Bartleby: La formula della creazione (1993) by Giorgio Agamben and Bartleby, ou la formule by Gilles Deleuze are two important philosophical essays reconsidering many of Melville's ideas.
 In Chapter 12 of the 1992 novel Mostly Harmless by Douglas Adams in The Hitchhiker's Guide to the Galaxy series, Arthur Dent decides to move to Bartledan, whose population does not need or want anything. Reading a novel of Bartledanian literature, he is bewildered to find that the protagonist of the novel unexpectedly dies of thirst just before the last chapter. Arthur is bewildered by other actions of the Bartledans, but "He preferred not to think about it." (page 78). He notes that "nobody in Bartledanian stories ever wanted anything."
 In 2001, Spanish writer Enrique Vila-Matas wrote Bartleby & Co., a book which deals with "the endemic disease of contemporary letters, the negative pulsion or attraction towards nothingness."
In her 2016 book My Private Property, Mary Ruefle's story "Take Frank" features a high school boy assigned to read Melville's Bartleby. The boy unwittingly mimics Bartleby when he declares he would "prefer not to."
 In his 2017 book Everybody Lies: big data, new data, and what the Internet can tell us about who we really are, Seth Stephens-Davidowits mentions that one-third of horses bred to be racehorses never, in fact, race. They simply "prefer not to," the author explains, as he draws an allusion to Melville's story.
 In her 2019 book How to Do Nothing, Jenny Odell references Bartleby as an example of resisting the demands of capitalism, and cultivating an ethic of refusal.
 In his 2018 book "Hiking With Nietzsche: Becoming Who You Are", John Kaag references the Bartleby story as a consideration of the Nietzschean possibility that freedom is realised in a self-destructive refusal to submit.
 In "Farrington the Scrivener: A Story of Dame Street," Morris Beja compares "Bartleby, the Scrivener" with "Counterparts", a story in Dubliners, by James Joyce. The essay is published in Coping With Joyce: Essays from the Copenhagen Symposium, edited by Morris Beja and Shari Benstock (Ohio State University Press, 1989), pp. 111-122.
 Abdulrazak Gurnah references Bartleby, the Scrivener throughout his 2001 novel By the Sea. The protagonist Saleh Omar quotes Bartleby's mantra to explain his decision to abstain from speaking the English language on seeking asylum in the UK.

Film and television 
 There is an angel named Bartleby in Kevin Smith's 1999 film Dogma. He shares some resemblance to Melville's character.
 The 2006 movie Accepted features a character named Bartleby Gaines, played by Justin Long. The characters share similar traits, and the movie uses some themes found in the work.
 In 2011, French director Jérémie Carboni made the documentary Bartleby en coulisses around Daniel Pennac's reading of "Bartleby the Scrivener".
 In "Skorpio", the sixth episode of the first season of the television show Archer, Archer quotes Bartleby, and then makes reference to Melville's being "not an easy read."
 In the season 1 episode of Ozark titled "Kaleidoscope", Marty explains to his wife Wendy that, if Del asks him to work for the drug cartel, he will respond as Bartleby would: "I'll give him my best Bartleby impersonation, and I'll say, 'I prefer not to'."
 A story arc from the sixth season of the American anime-style web series RWBY, revolving around a species of monsters named "The Apathy", is partially adapted from the story. A central, unseen character in the arc is named Bartleby as a nod to the title character.
 Bartleby is mentioned in an episode of HBO's In Treatment (season 3, episode 8).

Other 
The Slovenian philosopher Slavoj Žižek regularly quotes Bartleby's iconic line, usually in the context of the Occupy Wall Street movement.
The electronic text archive Bartleby.com is named after the character. The website's welcome statement describes its correlation with the short story, "so, Bartleby.com—after the humble character of its namesake scrivener, or copyist—publishes the classics of literature, nonfiction, and reference free of charge."
The British newspaper magazine The Economist maintains a column named Bartleby focused on the areas of work and management. It takes this name as it concerns itself with the plight of managers trying to understand how to motivate their employees, and to empathize with employees who “carry out their bosses’ often bewildering orders, even when they would ‘prefer not to’.” 
The 92nd Street Y presented a livestreamed and on-demand reading of the story by actor Paul Giamatti in November 2020. A December 3, 2020 conversation between Giamatti and Andrew Delbanco is archived on YouTube.

See also
 Interpassivity
 Office Space
 Pseudowork
 Refusal of work
 Slacker

References

Sources 
 Jaffé, David (1981). "Bartleby the Scrivener and Bleak House: Melville's Debt to Dickens". Arlington, Virginia: The Mardi Press.
 McCall, Dan (1989). The Silence of Bartleby. Ithaca and London: Cornell University Press. 
 Parker, Hershel (2002). Herman Melville: A Biography. Volume 2, 1851–1891. Baltimore and London: The Johns Hopkins University Press. 
 Sealts, Merton M., Jr. (1987). "Historical Note." Herman Melville, The Piazza Tales and Other Prose Pieces 1839-1860. Edited by Harrison Hayford, Alma A. MacDougall, and G. Thomas Tanselle. Evanston and Chicago: Northwestern University Press and The Newberry Library 1987.

External links 

 
 Bartleby, the Scrivener (Part I: Nov 1853) + (Part II: Dec 1853). Digital facsimile of first edition published in Putnam's Magazine. From the HathiTrust Digital Library.
 
https://www.bbc.co.uk/programmes/b007jx95

1853 short stories
Fictional scribes
Short stories by Herman Melville
Works originally published in Putnam's Magazine
Bureaucracy in fiction
Short stories adapted into films
Literature critical of work and the work ethic
Manhattan in fiction
Fiction about law
Starvation